Two ships of the Royal Navy have borne the name HMS Gentian, after the flower:

  was an  sloop launched in 1915 and mined in the Gulf of Finland, 16 July 1919.
  was a  launched in 1940 and scrapped in 1947.

Royal Navy ship names